Lower Moor is a village between Wyre Piddle and Fladbury in the district of Wychavon in Worcestershire, England.

Villages in Worcestershire